The 2020 Allier municipal elections took place on 15 March 2020, with a second round of voting initially expected for 22 March 2020. Like the rest of France, the second round was initially suspended due to the COVID-19 pandemic. On 22 May, Prime Minister Édouard Philippe announced that the second round of voting would take place on the 28th of June.

Incumbent and elected mayors 
In 2020, only 32 communes in Allier had a second round of elections, with the majority being decided with a single round absolute majority.

Aside from Bourbon-l'Archambault, candidates on the left were not able to recover communes lost in the previous elections, such as in Bellerive-sur-Allier, Cosne-d'Allier, Cusset, Gannat, Varennes-sur-Allier and Vendat. The left was consoled with a victory in Commentry. The right easily retained its position in the four largest communes of the department, despite a perilous four-way second round in Montluçon.

Results by number of mayors elected

Results

Department wide

Voter turnout

General results

Communes with more than 1,000 inhabitants

Results in communes with more than 3,000 inhabitants

Abrest 

 Incumbent mayor: Patrick Montagner (DVD)
 23 seats to be elected to the conseil municipal (population in 2017: 2,931 residents)
 2 seats to be elected to the conseil communautaire (CA Vichy Communauté)

Avermes 

 Incumbent mayor: Alain Denizot (PS)
 27 seats to be elected to the conseil municipal (population in 2017: 3,966 residents)
 4  seats to be elected to the conseil communautaire (CA Moulins Communauté)

Bellerive-sur-Allier 

 Incumbent mayor: François Sennepin (DVD)
 29 seats to be elected to the conseil municipal (population in 2017: 8,500 residents)
 6 seats to be elected to the conseil communautaire (CA Vichy Communauté)

Bourbon-l'Archambault 

 Incumbent mayor: Anne Leclercq (DVD)
 23 seats to be elected to the conseil municipal (population in 2017: 2,559 residents)
 8 seats to be elected to the conseil communautaire (CC du Bocage Bourbonnais)

Commentry 

 Incumbent mayor: Fernand Spaccaferri (UDI)
 29 seats to be elected to the conseil municipal (population in 2017: 6,239 residents)
 12 seats to be elected to the conseil communautaire (CC Commentry Montmarault Néris Communauté)

Cosne-d'Allier 

 Incumbent mayor: Martial Sanlias (DVD)
 19 seats to be elected to the conseil municipal (population in 2017: 2,039 residents)
 3 seats to be elected to the conseil communautaire (CC Commentry Montmarault Néris Communauté)

Creuzier-le-Vieux 

 Incumbent mayor: Christian Bertin (DVG)
 23 seats to be elected to the conseil municipal (population in 2017: 3,304 residents)
 2 seats to be elected to the conseil communautaire (CA Vichy Communauté)

Cusset 

 Incumbent mayor: Jean-Sebastien Laloy (LR)
 33 seats to be elected to the conseil municipal (population in 2017: 12,661 residents)
 10 seats to be elected to the conseil communautaire (CA Vichy Communauté)

Désertines 

 Incumbent mayor: Christian Sanvoisin (PCF)
 27 seats to be elected to the conseil municipal (population in 2017: 4,422 residents)
 4 seats to be elected to the conseil communautaire (CA Montluçon Communauté)

Domérat 

 Incumbent mayor: Marc Malbet (PS)
 29 seats to be elected to the conseil municipal (population in 2017: 8,780 residents)
 8 seats to be elected to the conseil communautaire (CA Montluçon Communauté)

Dompierre-sur-Besbre 

 Incumbent mayor: Pascal Vernisse (DVG)
 23 seats to be elected to the conseil municipal (population in 2017: 3,040 residents)
 7 seats to be elected to the conseil communautaire (CC Entr'Allier Besbre et Loire)

Gannat 

 Incumbent mayor: Véronique Pouzadoux (LR)
 29 seats to be elected to the conseil municipal (population in 2017: 5,832 residents)
 13 seats to be elected to the conseil communautaire (CC Saint-Pourçain Sioule Limagne)

Huriel 

 Incumbent mayor: Stéphane Abranowitch (DVG)
 23 seats to be elected to the conseil municipal (population in 2017: 2,646 residents)
 8 seats to be elected to the conseil communautaire (CC du Pays d'Huriel)

Lapalisse 

 Incumbent mayor: Jacques de Chabannes (PRG)
 23 seats to be elected to the conseil municipal (population in 2017: 3,123 residents)
 11 seats to be elected to the conseil communautaire (CC du Pays d'Huriel)

Lurcy-Lévis 

 Incumbent mayor: Claude Vanneau (DVD)
 19 seats to be elected to the conseil municipal (population in 2017: 1,893 residents)
 2 seats to be elected to the conseil communautaire (CA Moulins Communauté)

Montluçon 

 Incumbent mayor: Frédéric Laporte (LR)
 39 seats to be elected to the conseil municipal (population in 2017: 35,653 residents)
 30 seats to be elected to the conseil communautaire (CA Montluçon Communauté)

Moulins 

 Incumbent mayor: Pierre-André Périssol (LR)
 33 seats to be elected to the conseil municipal (population in 2017: 19,664 residents)
 20 seats to be elected to the conseil communautaire (CA Moulins Communauté)

Néris-les-Bains 

 Incumbent mayor: Alain Chapy (DVD)
 23 seats to be elected to the conseil municipal (population in 2017: 2,553 residents)
 5 seats to be elected to the conseil communautaire (CC Commentry Montmarault Néris Communauté)

Prémilhat 

 Incumbent mayor: Bernard Pozzoli (PS)
 19 seats to be elected to the conseil municipal (population in 2017: 2,458 residents)
 2 seats to be elected to the conseil communautaire (CA Montluçon Communauté)

Saint-Germain-des-Fossés 

 Incumbent mayor: Élisabeth Albert-Cuisset (DVD)
 27 seats to be elected to the conseil municipal (population in 2017: 3,656 residents)
 3 seats to be elected to the conseil communautaire (CA Vichy Communauté)

Saint-Pourçain-sur-Sioule 

 Incumbent mayor: Emmanyek Ferrand (LR)
 29 seats to be elected to the conseil municipal (population in 2017: 5,160 residents)
 11 seats to be elected to the conseil communautaire (CC Saint-Pourçain Sioule Limagne)

Saint-Victor 

 Incumbent mayor: Jean-Pierre Guérin (DVD)
 19 seats to be elected to the conseil municipal (population in 2017: 2,098 residents)
 2 seats to be elected to the conseil communautaire (CA Montluçon Communauté)

Saint-Yorre 

 Incumbent mayor: Joseph Kuchna (PCF)
 23 seats to be elected to the conseil municipal (population in 2017: 2,561 residents)
 2 seats to be elected to the conseil communautaire (CA Vichy Communauté)

Varennes-sur-Allier 

 Incumbent mayor: Roger Litaudon (DVD)
 27 seats to be elected to the conseil municipal (population in 2017: 3,561 residents)
 8 seats to be elected to the conseil communautaire (CC Entr'Allier Besbre et Loire)

Vendat 

 Incumbent mayor: Jean-Marc Germanangue (DVD)
 19 seats to be elected to the conseil municipal (population in 2017: 2,216 residents)
 1 seats to be elected to the conseil communautaire (CA Vichy Communauté)

Vichy 

 Incumbent mayor: Frédéric Aguilera (LR)
 35 seats to be elected to the conseil municipal (population in 2017: 24,166 residents)
 20 seats to be elected to the conseil communautaire (CA Vichy Communauté)

Yzeure 

 Incumbent mayor: Pascal Perrin (PS)
 33 seats to be elected to the conseil municipal (population in 2017: 13,088 residents)
 13 seats to be elected to the conseil communautaire (CA Moulins Communauté)

See also 

 2020 French municipal elections

References 

Allier_municipal_elections
Allier
Elections in Allier